Barbara Waring ( Barbara Alice Waring Gibb; 1 August 1911 – April 1990) was an English actress, screenwriter, and playwright.

Biography
Barbara Alice Waring Gibb was born on 1 August 1911 in Kent, England, the daughter of Dr. J. A. Gibb. She attended the Royal Academy of Dramatic Art, and was an actress in the 1930s and 1940s.

In the late 1930s she married Laurence A. Evans, a theatrical agent. They divorced and in 1947 she married the Hon. Geoffrey Cunliffe, son of Walter Cunliffe, 1st Baron Cunliffe, and Edith Cunningham Boothby, and Chairman of British Aluminium.

In 1963, she wrote the script for Two by the Sea and in 1974 that for Easter Tells Such Dreadful Lies. In 1967, she wrote the play The Jaywalker, performed at Coventry Cathedral with music by Duke Ellington.

She died in April 1990, aged 78, in Surrey, England.

Appearances
1935: His Majesty and Company as Princess Sandra
1935: The Girl in the Crowd as Mannequin
1942: In Which We Serve as Mrs MacAdoo, written by Noël Coward and directed by Noël Coward and David Lean
1943: The Gentle Sex as Joan Simpson, directed and narrated by Leslie Howard
1944: A Canterbury Tale as Polly Finn
1944: Heaven Is Round the Corner as Dorothy Trevor
1945: Twilight Hour as Gladys
1947: Hungry Hill as Barbara Brodrick, with a screenplay by Terence Young and Daphne du Maurier, from the novel by Daphne du Maurier

References

1911 births
1990 deaths
Alumni of RADA
English actresses
English female screenwriters
English dramatists and playwrights